Newland is an unincorporated community in Barkley Township, Jasper County, Indiana, United States.

History
A post office was established at Newland in 1901, and remained in operation until it was discontinued in 1925. A swamp which was drained to form the land where Newland stands caused the name to be selected.

Geography

References

Unincorporated communities in Jasper County, Indiana
Unincorporated communities in Indiana